Coenogonium australiense is a species of corticolous (bark-dwelling), crustose lichen in the family Coenogoniaceae. Found in Australia, it was formally described as a new species in 2018 by lichenologists Gintaras Kantvilas and Robert Lücking. The species epithet australiense refers to its geographical distribution. In addition to Tasmania, the lichen has also been documented from New South Wales and Kangaroo Island. In the latter location it was found in remnant stands of coniferous woodland, where it was growing on the bark of old, fissured Callitris trunks.

Description

The  cells are somewhat spherical to ellipsoid in shape and can be found as single cells or short chains. The hymenium is 60–80 μm thick and contains asci and paraphyses.

References

Gyalectales
Lichen species
Lichens described in 2018
Lichens of Australia
Taxa named by Gintaras Kantvilas
Taxa named by Robert Lücking